Mission Ridge may refer to:

Mission Ridge (British Columbia), a ridge in British Columbia, Canada
Mission Ridge Winter Park, a ski area in Saskatchewan, Canada
Mission Ridge Ski Area, a ski resort near Wenatchee, Washington, United States
Mission Ridge, South Dakota, an unincorporated community in South Dakota, United States
Mission Ridge, California; consists of Mission Peak, Mount Allison, Monument Peak

See also
 Mission Hills (disambiguation)
 Mission Mountain (disambiguation)
 Mission Peak, near Fremont, California
 Mission Terrace, in San Francisco, California